Elaine Frances Burton, Baroness Burton of Coventry (2 March 1904 – 6 October 1991) was a politician in the United Kingdom.

Career 
Burton stood twice to become a Member of Parliament, before being elected on her third candidacy. She lost as a Common Wealth Party candidate in the 1943 Hartlepool by-election, before switching to the Labour Party and losing as a candidate in Hendon South in the 1945 general election. In the 1950 general election, she was elected for the newly created constituency of Coventry South, holding the seat until 1959, when it was gained by the Conservative candidate Philip Hocking.

Burton was elevated to the peerage in April 1962 as Baroness Burton of Coventry, of Coventry in the County of Warwick, where she spoke on topics including women's opportunities in business and public life, and campaigned for the creation of an independent grant-supported body for sport, leading to her appointment to the newly formed Sports Council in 1965. She was also appointed to the Independent Television Authority between 1964 and 1969.

In March 1981 Burton was one of nine Labour peers who left the party to join the newly formed Social Democratic Party.  She became their spokesman in the Lords on civil aviation and consumer affairs. Like most other SDP peers, she objected to her party's merger with the Liberal Party in 1988 to become the Liberal Democrats, and became a member of David Owen's 'continuing' SDP until its dissolution in 1990. Thereafter she sat as a crossbencher until her death.

Notes

References

External links 
 



1904 births
1991 deaths
Politicians from Scarborough, North Yorkshire
Labour Party (UK) MPs for English constituencies
Female members of the Parliament of the United Kingdom for English constituencies
UK MPs 1950–1951
UK MPs 1951–1955
UK MPs 1955–1959
UK MPs who were granted peerages
Alumni of Leeds Beckett University
Burton of Coventry
Common Wealth Party politicians
Members of Parliament for Coventry
Social Democratic Party (UK) life peers
Social Democratic Party (UK, 1988) peers
20th-century British women politicians
People educated at Lawnswood High School
20th-century English women
20th-century English people
Common Wealth Party
Life peeresses created by Elizabeth II